The Economics Bulletin is a peer-reviewed open access academic journal that publishes concise notes, comments, and preliminary results in all areas of economics. The journal does not accept appeals and new versions of previously declined manuscripts. The journal was established in 2001 by Myrna Wooders. The current editor-in-chief is John P. Conley.

External links 
 

Economics journals
Open access journals
English-language journals
Quarterly journals